Joachim Baxla (16 January 1955 – 6 March 2017) was a member of the 14th Lok Sabha of India. He represented the Alipurduars constituency of West Bengal and was a member of the Revolutionary Socialist Party (RSP) political party. He won the Alipurduars seat four times in a row. Baxla was denied a ticket by RSP to contest the 15th Lok Sabha. In protest, he resigned from the RSP and contested the Alipurduar constituency as an independent and lost badly. RSP candidate Manohar Tirkey won the seat. He was relegated to the fourth position. He then joined the Trinamool Congress contesting the 2011 West Bengal Assembly election from the Kumargram (Vidhan Sabha constituency), and again lost the election to his RSP rival Dasrath Tirkey. 

Baxla died from cancer on 6 March 2017.

References

Sources
 Official biographical sketch in Parliament of India website

1955 births
2017 deaths
Lok Sabha members from West Bengal
People from Jalpaiguri district
Revolutionary Socialist Party (India) politicians
India MPs 1996–1997
India MPs 1998–1999
India MPs 1999–2004
India MPs 2004–2009
People from Alipurduar district
Trinamool Congress politicians from West Bengal